The Immaculate Conception Cathedral (also Tampico Cathedral) is the main Catholic church in the Diocese of Tampico in Tampico, Tamaulipas, Mexico. It is located opposite the Plaza de Armas, in the historical center of the city.

The erection of the Cathedral of Tampico was not carried out until 1841; the first stone was placed on May 9. The original project was undertaken by architect Lorenzo de la Hidalga, who was in charge of the work in 1850.
In 1917, the building suffered the collapse of its central nave, and in 1922, the west tower collapsed after being struck by lightning.

It was consecrated on November 12, 1931. It has three naves and a Latin cross plan.

See also
Roman Catholicism in Mexico
Immaculate Conception Cathedral

References

Roman Catholic cathedrals in Mexico
Roman Catholic churches completed in 1922
Church buildings with domes
20th-century Roman Catholic church buildings in Mexico